Kinel-Cherkassy is a rural locality (a selo) and the administrative center of Kinel-Cherkassky District, Samara Oblast, Russia. Population:

References

Notes

Sources

Rural localities in Samara Oblast